= List of people engulfed by a whale =

Wikimedia list article

There have been documented and anecdotal cases of people who either have been or claim to have been engulfed or swallowed by whales, sharks, or other marine creatures.

== Whales ==
In February 2019, Rainer Schimp was engulfed and almost swallowed by a whale off the coast of Port Elizabeth, South Africa, during a feeding frenzy. His legs remained outside the whale’s mouth, and a photo of Schimp and the whale was taken, soon going viral on social media. He was spat out without any serious injury.

In November 2020, Julie McSorley and Liz Cottriel were tossed from their kayak in Avilla Beach, California, as the boats capsized. A whale picked them up and they were reported as being briefly inside the mouth. They were spat out without serious injury.

In June 2021, a man named Michael Packard claimed that he was almost swallowed off the coast of Provincetown, Massachusetts. He alleged he was inside the whale for around 30-40 seconds, thinking he was inside the mouth of a great white shark. He was said to have banged on the whales mouth, making it spit him out. Experts say this story is impossible, although he denies lying, and most of the media presents this story as a fact.

In February 2025, Adrian Simancas was engulfed by a whale, along with his kayak. At first Simancas was afraid as the whales massive jaws closed. Then, just as suddenly, the whale spat him out without any serious injury. His father recorded the entire footage.

In 1891, James Bartley claimed he was trapped inside the mouth of a humpback whale for approx. 4 hours. However, historical research found he was not on the list of the ships passengers, so his story is likely a myth.

== Sharks ==
In January 2007, Eric Nerhaus was collecting shellfish off the coast of Eden, Australia, when a shark attacked him. He claimed roughly half his body was inside the shark. He was able to punch the shark, making it swim away. He suffered many devastating injuries to his body.

In September 2025, Mauricio Hoyos was tagging a shark in Cocos Island, Costa Rica when it turned and it enclosed Hoyos’ head into his jaws. He survived 27 puncture wounds and extensive injuries.

According to Tyler Hart of Divers Alert network, a 62-year old woman was sucked into the mouth of a whale shark in July 2005. It went up to her thighs before the woman was reportedly expelled with no major injury.

In September 2024, the body of missing American diver Colleen Monfroe were found inside an unknown shark in Timor Leste. It’s unclear how she died, but the evidence suggests she was most likely swallowed by the shark.

== Other animals ==
In the summer 2005, an 100-pound grouper engulfed the head of a man named Bob Charles while spearfishing in the Florida Keys. He sustained bruises and a cut lip.

In 1974, a jewfish (now called a grouper) engulfed the head of diver Steve Withers while scuba diving off the coast of South Padre Island, Texas. This is supported by his companion, John Beard. He was released from the jewfish’s mouth with only minor injuries.
